The moraharpa is a modern name for an early predecessor of the nyckelharpa keyed fiddle; the primary example instrument dated 1526, was found in Mora, Sweden. A number of modern reproductions of the original moraharpa have been made since the 1980s, and the name moraharpa, in addition to referring to a single, specific instrument, has come to mean a type of nyckelharpa similar in design to the original moraharpa.

Museum example
The instrument has an inscription on the back with the date 1526, but it is unlikely to have been made that early.  A Swedish scholar, Per-Ulf Allmo,  has suggested that the instrument and another in the same style were probably built in Särna, northern Dalarna around 1680, with Praetorius as inspiration, and with no close affinity with the nyckelharpa tradition in northern Uppland, the stronghold of the instrument.

The soundbox has an hourglass shape and looks very much like the illustration of a nyckelharpa in Michael Praetorius's Syntagma Musicum III of 1620 (where it is called ).  It has a straight bridge, one melody string, two drone strings, and one row of keys. It is currently displayed in the Zorn Museum in the village of Mora in Dalarna, Sweden, hence its name.

References

Swedish musical instruments
Bowed box zithers
Early musical instruments